Alexandre Duarte Silva (born November 7, 1983 in São Paulo), known as Alexandre Silva, is a Brazilian footballer who plays as defender.

Career statistics

References

External links

1983 births
Living people
Brazilian footballers
Association football defenders
Campeonato Brasileiro Série C players
Santa Cruz Futebol Clube players
Clube Atlético Linense players
Uberaba Sport Club players
São José Esporte Clube players
Iraty Sport Club players
Mogi Mirim Esporte Clube players
Anápolis Futebol Clube players
Footballers from São Paulo